The Monument to Confederate Women, also known as the "Mother of the South", is a commemorative sculpture on the grounds of the Arkansas State Capitol in Little Rock, Arkansas. It depicts a mother and two of her children saying goodbye to an older son who is dressed in a Confederate uniform. The statue was created by J. Otto Schweizer, and was dedicated in 1913. It was funded by the United Confederate Veterans.

The memorial was listed on the National Register of Historic Places in 1996.

See also

National Register of Historic Places listings in Little Rock, Arkansas

References

1913 sculptures
Confederate States of America monuments and memorials in Arkansas
Monuments and memorials in Little Rock, Arkansas
Monuments and memorials on the National Register of Historic Places in Arkansas
Monuments and memorials to women
National Register of Historic Places in Little Rock, Arkansas
Neoclassical architecture in Arkansas
Statues in Arkansas
Tourist attractions in Little Rock, Arkansas
1913 establishments in Arkansas